Bishop Marco Copula, O.S.B. (Latin: Marcus Copula) (died 1527) was a Roman Catholic prelate who served as Bishop of Montepeloso (1498–1527).

Biography
Marco Copula was ordained a priest in the Order of Saint Benedict.
On 26 November 1498, he was appointed during the papacy of Pope Alexander VI as Bishop of Montepeloso.
He served as Bishop of Montepeloso until his death in 1527.

References

External links and additional sources
 (Chronology of Bishops) 
 (Chronology of Bishops) 

15th-century Italian Roman Catholic bishops
16th-century Italian Roman Catholic bishops
Bishops appointed by Pope Alexander VI
1527 deaths
Benedictine bishops